Maria Suceso Portales Casamar (Zahínos, Badajoz, March 4, 1904 – Sevilla, January 23, 1999) was an Extremaduran anarcho-feminist.

Biography
She was born into an anarchist family; her siblings Juan and Luis would also be active within the anarchist movement. She was noted for her participation in Mujeres Libres, a libertarian women's organization, which she joined in 1936, and its periodical. Characterized as a "reactionary", she served as the organization's national vice-secretary. She was also active in Libertarian Youth and Confederación Nacional del Trabajo. Portales was one of the interviewees in Vivir la utopía. She became an exile in the UK in 1939. In November 1964, she began editing the journal Mujeres Libres from London.

References

Bibliography
 Martha A. Ackelsberg, La vie sera mille fois plus belle : les Mujeres Libres, les anarchistes espagnols et l'émancipation des femmes, translated from English by Marianne Enckell and Alain Thévenet, Atelier de création libertaire, 2010, . (in French)
 Mary Nash, L’action des femmes dans la guerre d’Espagne, in Encyclopédie politique et historique des femmes - Europe, Amérique du Nord, dir. Christine Faure, PUF, 1997. (in French)
 Collectif, Mujeres libres, des femmes libertaires en lutte : mémoire vive de femmes libertaires dans la Révolution espagnole, Éditions du Monde libertaire, 2000, Cgecaf. (in French)

1904 births
1999 deaths
People from Badajoz
Mujeres Libres
20th-century Spanish writers
20th-century Spanish women writers
Spanish women of the Spanish Civil War (Republican faction)